Bartlam is a surname. Notable people with the surname include: 

Dorothy Bartlam (1907–1991), English actress
John Bartlam (1735–1781), British/American pottery manufacturer
Lilly Bartlam (born 2006), Canadian child actress

See also
Bartram